Thunder Boogie is probably the best known work by hard rock band Lamont. The album has a more raw sound than most of their material. The song "Hotwire" was featured in the video game, Tony Hawks Underground.

Track listing
"Hot Wire" 3:02
"Vegas" 2:03
"I Saw Red" 2:38
"Rocket Ride" 3:26
"One White Line" 3:29
"Thunderboogie" 2:32
"Hell's Got Me Runnin'" 2:54
"Psychopath" 3:59
"Agent 49" 7:02
Contains as hidden track a cover version of "Nasty Dogs and Funky Kings" by ZZ Top; Album: Fandango (1975)

Personnel
Pete Knipfing: Guitar Vocals
Mike Cosgrove: Bass, Organ
Todd Bowman: Drums, Percussion
Other:
Illustrations by Kevin Cyr

External links
 

Lamont (band) albums
2002 albums